Li Meiling may refer to:

Margaret Lee (Singaporean actress) (born 1970), Singaporean actress
Tracy Lee (actress) (born 1985), Singaporean actress
Meiling Li, a character from the Cardcaptor Sakura anime series